The 2014-2015 season was FK Sarajevo's 66th season in history, and their 21st consecutive season in the top flight of Bosnian football.

Players

Squad

(Captain)

(C)

(C)

(Captain)

Statistics

Technical Staff
As of 10 October 2014, the staff includes:

Kit

Friendlies

Competitions

Premier League

League table

Matches

Cup of Bosnia and Herzegovina

Round of 32

Round of 16

Quarter-finals

UEFA Europa League

Second qualifying round

Third qualifying round

Play-off round

References

External links
Official Website 
FK Sarajevo at Facebook
FK Sarajevo at Twitter
FK Sarajevo at UEFA
FKSinfo 

FK Sarajevo seasons
Sarajevo